Mohamed Hassani is a paralympic athlete from Egypt competing mainly in category F53 discus  events.

Mohamed competed in the 1996 Summer Paralympics in the F53 discus.  Having missed the 2000 games he returned in 2004 to win the bronze medal in the F53 discus.

References

External links
 

Year of birth missing (living people)
Living people
Paralympic athletes of Egypt
Paralympic bronze medalists for Egypt
Paralympic medalists in athletics (track and field)
Athletes (track and field) at the 1996 Summer Paralympics
Athletes (track and field) at the 2004 Summer Paralympics
Medalists at the 2004 Summer Paralympics
Egyptian male discus throwers
Wheelchair discus throwers
Paralympic discus throwers